The Borneo bow-fingered gecko (Cyrtodactylus malayanus) is a species of gecko that is endemic to Borneo.

References 

Cyrtodactylus
Reptiles described in 1915
Taxa named by Nelly de Rooij